The Rwanda Women Parliamentary Forum (FFRP) is a cross-party women’s caucus aimed at uniting women in the Rwandan parliament towards common goals, and championing gender equality interests at the legislative level. Founded in 1996, the FFRP’s specific objectives include building solidarity among female members of parliament (MPs) regardless of differing party ideologies, supporting women in parliament to get involved in the revision or repeal of laws that discriminate against women, and to raise awareness among other MPs, as well as public and private institutions, about the importance of gender equality. Their motto is “solidarity, women's empowerment and equality”. 

The FFRP is a part of Rwanda's national gender machinery. It advocates that all national laws and policies give consideration to gender issues, including the country's national budget. The FFRP also works to build the capacity of women Parliamentarians, in order to carry out advocacy around gender and development issues, and to successfully manage their other parliamentary duties.

Mission & Vision 
The stated mission of the FFRP is “to contribute to the building of an egalitarian, equitable, inclusive and participatory society, playing the influential role in gender matters in accordance with the Parliament mission”. The stated vision of the FFRP is “A society characterized by unity, equality and equity between men and women”.

Achievements

Legislative

The Law on the Prevention and Punishment of Gender-based Violence 
The FFRP was responsible for drafting and introducing the Gender-Based Violence Bill (GBV), a private members bill and the only bill so far, at that point in time, to have originated outside of the executive branch of government. The process of drafting the original bill began in early 2005, when the FFRP mobilized its members and reached out to community leaders across the country to gather information and recommendations from the general population on how to define, prevent and appropriately punish acts of GBV. Following initial community outreach, a mass-media campaign began with the intention of raising awareness and sensitizing the country to the problem of GBV. Later on in the year, female parliamentarians of the FFRP returned to the field again to consult further with communities regarding the bill, and worked in collaboration with NAWOCO to conduct discussion sessions with women only, in addition to the discussions already taking place that involved both women and men. A consultative committee was established involving the Ministry of Gender, the Ministry of Justice, the national police, the legal community and civil society. The “Draft Law on Prevention, Protection and Punishment of Any Gender-Based Violence” was presented to Parliament on August 2, 2006, and after internal deliberation and revision, was passed into law in 2009. Though the deliberation period was longer than desired, the process of drafting the bill was extremely collaborative, and demonstrated the state’s apparent commitment to engaging in a two-way dialogue with civil society about important matters of gender justice.

The Law, also known in short-hand as the GBV law, defines different forms of gender-based violence and the applicable punishment for these crimes; the full text of the law can be accessed online in three different languages (English, French and Kinyarwanda).

Community development 
The FFRP has supported communities in Rwanda through various activities, including donating cows, distributing water tanks to households, planting kitchen gardens, and donating house materials, including schools materials to girls who have dropped out of school. For their 20th anniversary, the FFRP visited Gisagara District as it is one of the most vulnerable districts in Rwanda. Gisagara District is one of 8 districts that have now entered into partnerships with the FFRP since 2011, in terms of economic empowerment efforts for the district's most vulnerable women. The FFRP has also sought collaboration with Gisagara District authorities involving outreach programmes dedicated to helping the local community increase its innovative capacity.

Women in Rwanda's Parliament 
Rwanda has a bicameral parliament. It consists of two chambers, the Senate (Upper House) and the Chamber of Deputies (Lower House). Rwanda was the first country in the world with a female majority in parliament, currently at 61.3% for the Lower House and 38.5% for the Upper House. Cuba is currently second to Rwanda for majority of female parliamentarians.

References 

Parliament of Rwanda
Women in Rwanda